Queen is an unincorporated community in Bedford County, Pennsylvania, United States. Queen had a post office until April 23, 2005; it retains its own ZIP code, 16670.

References

Unincorporated communities in Bedford County, Pennsylvania
Unincorporated communities in Pennsylvania